Stuart Bay is an Arctic waterway in Qikiqtaaluk Region, Nunavut, Canada. Located off northwestern Bathurst Island, the bay is on the east side of May Inlet.

Other bays in the area include Purcell Bay, Dampier Bay, and Half Moon Bay.

Geology
The Stuart Bay Formation is characterized by limestone and interbedded sandstone.

References

Bays of Qikiqtaaluk Region